Delta Circini (δ Cir), is a multiple star system located in the constellation Circinus. Delta Circini is also known as HR 5664, and HD 135240. The system has a combined apparent visual magnitude of +5.09, and is located at a distance of about 700 pc (2,300ly) from the Sun.

Companions
δ Circini A is a spectroscopic triple star, although the outer component has been resolved using the VLTI PIONIER instrument.  The two inner components form an eclipsing binary system.

δ Circini B is a 13th magnitude companion nearly an arc-second away.  It is unclear whether the two are physically associated and little is known about the fainter star although it has been reported to be a G5 main sequence star or giant.

HD 135160 is a 6th magnitude binary Be star that shares a common space motion with δ Circini and is only 4 arc minutes away.  The two make a faint naked eye pair.

System properties

All three components of δ Circini A are hot luminous stars.  The brightest is an O8 star just beginning to evolve away from the main sequence.  It is in a very close orbit with an O9.5 main sequence star.  The two stars are deformed into ellipsoidal shapes and eclipse each other every 3.9 days.  The total brightness change is only 0.15 magnitudes.

The third component is a B0.5 main sequence star in a long eccentric orbit around the close pair.  It is fainter and cooler than either of the two close stars, yet it is calculated to be more massive than δ Cir A, so it is suspected that it may also be a close binary system.

References

External links

http://www.alcyone.de/cgi-bin/search.pl?object=HR5664 

Circinus (constellation)
Circini, Delta
Circini, Delta
O-type subgiants
O-type giants
B-type main-sequence stars
5664
135240
074778
CD-60 05539
Triple star systems
Emission-line stars